Along the Ridge is a 2006 Italian drama film directed by Kim Rossi Stuart (in his directorial debut), from a screenplay he co-wrote with Linda Ferri, Federico Starnone and Francesco Giammusso. The film stars Alessandro Morace, Barbora Bobuľová and Rossi Stuart.

At the 2006 Flaiano Prizes, Morace and Rossi Stuart received the awards for Best Male Newcomer and Best Director, respectively.

Premise
11-year-old Tommi and his slightly older sister, Viola, live with their father in Rome. They cope with being a single-parent family until their mother shows up after the latest of many unannounced absences. The film shows their continuing struggle with love, friendship, puberty and life in general.

Cast
 Alessandro Morace as Tommaso "Tommi" Benetti
 Kim Rossi Stuart as Renato Benetti
 Barbora Bobuľová as Stefania Benetti
 Marta Nobili as Viola Benetti
 Pietro De Silva as Domenico
 Roberta Paladini as Letizia
 Sebastiano Tiraboschi as Antonio
 Francesco Benedetto as Vincenzo
 Roberta Lena as Marina
 Stefano Busirivici as Barzelli
 Marco Bardi as Guglielmo
 Greta Alice Gorietti as Elena
 Francesca Strati as Monica
 Federico Santolini as Claudio
 Manuela Occhiuzzi as Teacher

References

External links
 

2006 films
2006 directorial debut films
2006 drama films
Films about dysfunctional families
Films set in Rome
Films shot in Abruzzo
Films shot in Rome
Italian drama films
2000s Italian films